Portrait of Eliezer Alsheh is a picture of Bulgarian artist, by  from 1928.

Analysis
The picture is painted with oil on canvas. It represents a portrait of Bulgarian and Argentinean artist .

Description
The dimensions of the picture are 54 × 39 cm. It is at the National Art Gallery (Bulgaria) in Sofia.

References 

Alshekh
1928 paintings
Alshekh
National Art Gallery, Bulgaria